Inverclyde is a parliamentary constituency of the House of Commons of the Parliament of the United Kingdom. It replaced Greenock and Inverclyde and the Port Glasgow and Kilmacolm areas from West Renfrewshire for the 2005 general election.

Iain McKenzie of the Labour Party won the ensuing Inverclyde by-election following the death of the previous Labour MP, David Cairns. At the 2015 general election, the seat was gained by Ronnie Cowan of the Scottish National Party, with a majority of 11,063 votes. At the 2017 snap election, Cowan was re-elected, but with a greatly reduced majority of just 384 votes. However, at the 2019 general election he was re-elected with a significantly increased majority of 7,512 votes, making this a safe seat for the SNP.

Constituency profile
Most of the population live along the Clyde in the north of the seat, and there is a more rural area to the south in Clyde Muirshiel Regional Park.  Residents are slightly less affluent than the Scottish and UK averages.

Boundaries

The constituency covers the Inverclyde council area. This includes the towns and villages of Gourock, Greenock, Inverkip, Kilmacolm, Port Glasgow, Quarriers Village and Wemyss Bay.

Members of Parliament

Elections

Elections in the 2010s

1 Change to majority not useful when seat changes hands.

Elections in the 2000s

References

Westminster Parliamentary constituencies in Scotland
Constituencies of the Parliament of the United Kingdom established in 2005
Politics of Inverclyde
Port Glasgow
Greenock
Gourock